River Bluff is a historic home located near Wintergreen, Nelson County, Virginia. It is sited on a steep bank overlooking the South Fork of the Rockfish River.  It is a three-part Flemish bond brick house consisting of a two-story central pavilion with one-story flanking wings. The main block was constructed about 1785, and the house achieved its final form by about 1805.

It was listed on the National Register of Historic Places in 1980.

References

Houses in Nelson County, Virginia
Houses completed in 1785
Georgian architecture in Virginia
Houses on the National Register of Historic Places in Virginia
National Register of Historic Places in Nelson County, Virginia